The Tilburg chess tournament was a series of very strong chess tournaments held in Tilburg, Netherlands. It was established in 1977 and ran continuously through 1994 under the sponsorship of Interpolis, an insurance company. Fontys Hogescholen shortly revived the tournament series from 1996 to 1998, when the last edition was played. Since 1994 there is another annual chess tournament taking place in Tilburg, which has the name De Stukkenjagers, the field is generally much weaker than the traditional Tilburg tournament.

1977
The first edition was a very strong all-grandmaster event of Category 14. It was a single round-robin tournament with twelve players. Karpov won the event.

1978
The second edition was similar in strength as the first edition, again an all grandmaster event of category 14.  No Russian players participated as Karpov and Korchnoi were playing a match at that time and their proposed Russian replacements were not accepted. Portisch won the event.

1979

1980

1981

1982

1983

1984

1985

1986

1987

1988

1989

1990

1991
{| class="wikitable" style="text-align: center;"
|+ 15th Tilburg Interpolis, 17 October – 4 November 1991, Tilburg, Netherlands, Category XVII (2664)
! !!Player!!Rating!!1!!2!!3!!4!!5!!6!!7!!8!!Total!!TPR
|-
|-style="background:#ccffcc;"
|1||align=left|||2770|| ||½ ½||1 0||½ 1||½ ½||1 1||1 ½||1 1||10||2807
|-
|2||align=left|||2650||½½||||0 ½||½ ½||1 1||1 ½||½ ½||1 ½||8½||2746
|-
|3||align=left|||2650||0 1||1 ½||||1 0||1 0||0 ½||1 ½||1 ½||8||2716
|-
|4||align=left|||2730||½ 0||½ ½||0 1||||½ 0||½ 1||½ 1||½ 1||7½||2684
|-
|5||align=left|||2595||½ ½||0 0||0 1||½ 1||||1 0||½ ½||½ 1||7||2674
|-
|6||align=left|||2630||0 0||0 ½||1 ½||½ 0||0 1||||1 0||1 1||6½||2640
|-
|7||align=left|||2610||0 ½||½ ½||0 ½||½ 0||½ ½||0 1||||½ ½||5½||2592
|-
|8||align=left|||2680||0 0||0 ½||0 ½||½ 0||½ 0||0 0||½ ½||||3||2432
|}

1992
In 1992 the tournament was for the first time held in the knockout format and comprised three days per round. Game one on day one, game two on day two (both at classic time limits). Day three was a rest day, but for those tied 1-1 it was the day to play two more tie-break games (each with rapid time limit) and in a few cases, another two. The format was described by some commentators as very brutal. Anyone getting off to a slow start would be eliminated and sent home in just two or three days, such as happened to the entire Hungarian squad of Lajos Portisch, Gyula Sax, Zoltán Ribli, József Pintér and Peter Leko. Those who did not win cleanly in the initial two games of each round found fatigue a great problem, due to having to give up their rest days. The benefit over the old double round-robin format, was that it opened up the potential for an unexpected winner and this made it exciting for the spectators. The traditional format favours those highly graded players who win year after year by agreeing quick draws against their closest rivals and defeating the rest.

The 1992 edition had 111 participants, 94 in round one, with the 47 winners then being joined by 17 seeded players given a bye to round two. Round two therefore comprised 64 players, round three 32 and round four 16. Below are the results from round four onwards. At the time, this was the largest prize fund of any traditional tournament. Adams won 100,000 Dutch guilders, the overall fund was 500,000 dg. The seeded players were given very generous conditions of a guaranteed 10,000 guilders to ensure their attendance.

1993
The 1993 edition was played in the same format as the 1992 edition with 112 participants; round one had 96 unseeded entrants and 16 seeded players (with a bye) joined the winners in round two. Tie-break games were played at a time control of twenty minutes plus ten second increment. The prize fund was the same as last year: 500,000 Dutch guilders (100,000 for the winner) and minimum 10,000 dg. guaranteed to seeded players. Of the seventeen host country players that started, only two made it past the first round. They were joined by the seeded Jan Timman and Jeroen Piket. Paul van der Sterren declined to play after his request to be seeded was turned down.

1994
The final edition to be organised under Interpolis' sponsorship was another large knockout tournament.

At the opening ceremony, a spokesman for Interpolis shocked the audience with an announcement that the company was reconsidering its chess and other public relations activities, following a total merger with Rabobank. FIDE President Florencio Campomanes attended the opening, primarily to lend support to the FIDE Women's Candidates tournament, which was being held at Tilburg alongside the Interpolis event.

The event commenced with a first round of 112 participants and the 56 winners were then joined by eight seeded players to make up a 64-player second round. The seeded players were Karpov (Elo rating 2780), Salov (2710), Ivanchuk (2695), Bareev (2695), Khalifman (2645), Epishin (2650), Timman (2635), and K. Georgiev (2615).

Due to a clash with another strong tournament in Horgen, the line-up was slightly depleted this time. Garry Kasparov, Alexei Shirov, Artur Yusupov, Viktor Korchnoi, Joël Lautier, Boris Gelfand, Peter Leko and Tony Miles were among those who favoured the rival event. Additionally, some Russian players were staying at home to prepare for their national championship, a precursor to selection for the Olympiad team.

Everyone was surprised to see the return of the Brazilian GM Henrique Mecking, a former world-class player, who had suffered a life-threatening condition some eighteen years previously and had been in a slow recovery ever since.

Held at the Interpolis headquarters, round one heralded the largest number of 'big reputation' casualties since the introduction of the knockout format. Alexander Beliavsky, Victor Bologan, Mikhail Gurevich, Curt Hansen, Lembit Oll, Alon Greenfeld, Ilya Smirin, Veselin Topalov and home favourite Jeroen Piket all had to pack their bags after just three days.

As before, each round comprised two (classic time limit) games on days one and two, followed by a rest day, which was also the day to conclude tie-breaks (starting with pairs of rapid time limit games and followed, if necessary, with blitz games).

1996
{| class="wikitable" style="text-align: center;"
|+ 1st Tilburg Fontys, 10 – 23 October 1996, Tilburg, Netherlands, Category XVI (2648)
! !!Player!!Rating!!1!!2!!3!!4!!5!!6!!7!!8!!9!!10!!11!!12!!Total!!SB!!TPR!!Place
|-
|-style="background:#ccffcc;"
|1||align=left|||2580|| ||½||1||1||½||½||½||½||½||½||1||½||7||38.00||2756||1–2
|-
|-style="background:#ccffcc;"
|2||align=left|||2665||½|| ||1||½||½||½||1||1||½||½||½||½||7||38.00||2748||1–2
|-
|3||align=left|||2685||0||0||||0||1||½||1||½||1||1||½||1||6½|| ||2710||3
|-
|4||align=left|||2605||0||½||1||||½||1||½||0||1||½||½||½||6||32.25||2688||4–5
|-
|5||align=left|||2630||½||½||0||½||||0||½||½||½||1||1||1||6||30.25||2686||4–5
|-
|6||align=left|||2775||½||½||½||0||1||||½||½||0||½||1||½||5½||30.25||2636||6–7
|-
|7||align=left|||2685||½||0||0||½||½||½||||1||½||½||½||1||5½||28.00||2645||6–7
|-
|8||align=left|||2565||½||0||½||1||½||½||0||||½||½||0||1||5|| ||2619||8
|-
|9||align=left|||2655||½||½||0||0||½||1||½||½||||½||½||0||4½||25.25||2582||9–11
|-
|10||align=left|||2650||½||½||0||½||0||½||½||½||½||||½||½||4½||24.50||2583||9–11
|-
|11||align=left|||2620||0||½||½||½||0||0||½||1||½||½||||½||4½||24.00||2585||9–11
|-
|12||align=left|||2665||½||½||0||½||0||½||0||0||1||½||½||||4|| ||2544||12
|}

1997
{| class="wikitable" style="text-align: center;"
|+ 2nd Tilburg Fontys, 26 September – 10 October 1997, Tilburg, Netherlands, Category XVII (2667)
! !!Player!!Rating!!1!!2!!3!!4!!5!!6!!7!!8!!9!!10!!11!!12!!Total!!SB!!TPR!!Place
|-
|-style="background:#ccffcc;"
|1||align=left|||2660|| ||1||½||½||½||½||1||½||½||1||1||1||8||39.50||2844||1–3
|-
|-style="background:#ccffcc;"
|2||align=left|||2820||0|| ||½||½||1||1||1||½||1||½||1||1||8||38.25||2829||1–3
|-
|-style="background:#ccffcc;"
|3||align=left|||2770||½||½|| ||½||½||½||1||1||1||½||1||1||8||38.00||2834||1–3
|-
|4||align=left|||2680||½||½||½||||½||½||½||1||½||1||½||1||7||34.50||2769||4–5
|-
|5||align=left|||2635||½||0||½||½||||½||½||1||1||½||1||1||7||32.00||2773||4–5
|-
|6||align=left|||2670||½||0||½||½||½||||1||½||½||1||½||½||6|| ||2704|| 6
|-
|7||align=left|||2700||0||0||0||½||½||0||||½||1||1||½||1||5|| ||2629|| 7
|-
|8||align=left|||2660||½||½||0||0||0||½||½||||½||0||1||1||4½||19.75||2604||8–9
|-
|9||align=left|||2655||½||0||0||½||0||½||0||½||||½||1||1||4½||18.75||2603||8–9
|-
|10||align=left|||2625||0||½||½||0||½||0||0||1||½||||½||½||4|| ||2570|| 10
|-
|11||align=left|||2630||0||0||0||½||0||½||½||0||0||½||||½||2½|| ||2460|| 11
|-
|12||align=left|||2500||0||0||0||0||0||½||0||0||0||½||½||||1½|| || 2374 || 12
|}

1998
{| class="wikitable" style="text-align: center;"
|+ 3rd Tilburg Fontys, 24 October – 5 November 1998, Tilburg, Netherlands, Category XVIII (2680)
! !!Player!!Rating!!1!!2!!3!!4!!5!!6!!7!!8!!9!!10!!11!!12!!Total!!SB!!TPR!!Place
|-
|-style="background:#ccffcc;"
|1||align=left|||2795|| ||½||½||½||1||½||1||½||½||½||1||1||7½||||2803||1
|-
|2||align=left|||2665||½||||½||½||1||½||1||½||½||1||½||½||7||||2784||2
|-
|3||align=left|||2660||½||½||||½||½||½||1||½||½||½||½||½||6||32.75||2718||3–5
|-
|4||align=left|||2650||½||½||½||||0||1||½||½||½||½||1||½||6||32.00||2719||3–5
|-
|5||align=left|||2780||0||0||½||1||||½||½||½||½||½||1||1||6||29.75||2707||3–5
|-
|6||align=left|||2605||½||½||½||0||½||||½||0||1||½||1||½||5½||29.50||2687||6–7
|-
|7||align=left|||2715||0||0||0||½||½||½||||1||½||1||½||1||5½||26.50||2677||6–7
|-
|8||align=left|||2710||½||½||½||½||½||1||0||||1||0||0||½||5||28.50||2642||8–9
|-
|9||align=left|||2635||½||½||½||½||½||0||½||0||||½||½||1||5||27.00||2649||8–9
|-
|10||align=left|||2700||½||0||½||½||½||½||0||1||½||||0||½||4½||24.75||2614||10–11
|-
|11||align=left|||2625||0||½||½||0||0||0||½||1||½||1||||½||4½||23.00||2620||10–11
|-
|12||align=left|||2625||0||½||½||½||0||½||0||½||0||½||½||||3½||||2552||12
|}

References
Tilburg chess events
Complete crosstables
The stukkenjagers tournament in Tilburg
CHESS magazine - issues January 1993 pp. 6–14; February 1994 pp. 4–7; January 1995 pp. 16–18

Chess competitions
Chess in the Netherlands
1977 in chess
1998 in chess
Recurring events disestablished in 1998
Recurring sporting events established in 1977
1977 establishments in the Netherlands
Sports competitions in Tilburg